The 3rd Army Division is a unit of the Argentine Army.

Organization 

 3rd Army Division, in Bahía Blanca
 I Armored Brigade, in Tandil
 IX Mechanized Brigade, in Comodoro Rivadavia
 XI Mechanized Brigade, in Río Gallegos

Names 
 5th Army Corps
 3rd Army Division

See also 

 1st Army Division (Argentina)
 2nd Army Division (Argentina)

References

External links 
 argentina.gob.ar/ejercito

Army units and formations of Argentina